The 203 mm 45 caliber Pattern 1892 was a Russian naval gun developed in the years before the Russo-Japanese War that armed a variety of warships of the Imperial Russian Navy during the Russo-Japanese War and World War I.  Guns salvaged from scrapped ships found a second life as coastal artillery.  It is believed none were in service during World War II.

History
The 203 mm 45 caliber was designed in 1892 and soon went into production.  The initial order was for twenty guns and by May 1901 thirteen had been completed.  Production was restarted in 1915 to replace worn out guns and nine more were delivered.  A follow up order for seventeen to be completed in 1917-18 was placed, but not completed due to the October Revolution of 1917.  In addition to the guns used aboard ships eight were installed in two coastal artillery batteries of four guns each on the islands of Nargen and Mäkiluoto.

Naval use
The 203 mm 45 caliber Pattern 1892 guns armed armored cruisers, gunboats and pre-dreadnought battleships of the Imperial Russian Navy built or refit between 1892-1916.

Armored cruisers
 Bayan-class - This class of four ships primary armament consisted of two, 203 mm 45 caliber guns, in single turrets fore and aft.
 Rurik-class - The primary armament of Gromoboi consisted of four, 203 mm 45 caliber guns, in single mounts.  Two were in casemates fore and two casemates aft for Gromoboi.  The primary armament of Rossia consisted of four, 203 mm 45 caliber guns, in single mounts.  Two were in casemates fore and two were on sponsons aft for Rossia.

Gunboats
 Khrabryy - The primary armament of this ship consisted of two, shielded, single mount, 203 mm 45 caliber guns, in forward sponsons.

Pre-dreadnought battleships
 Imperator Aleksandr II - This ships secondary armament consisted of five, 203 mm 45 caliber guns, in single mounts, after a 1904 refit.

Ammunition
Ammunition was of separate loading type with a bagged charge and projectile.

The gun was able to fire:
 Armor Piercing - 
 Common - 
 High Explosive - 
 SAP - 
 Shrapnel -

Photo gallery

References

Notes

External links
 http://www.navweaps.com/Weapons/WNRussian_8-45_m1892.php

Artillery of the Russian Empire
Russo-Japanese war weapons of Russia
Artillery of the Soviet Union
Coastal artillery
203 mm artillery
Obukhov State Plant products